The 2014–15 LV Cup (styled as the LV= Cup) is the 44th season of England's national rugby union cup competition, and the tenth to follow the Anglo-Welsh format.

The competition consists of the four Welsh Pro12 teams and the twelve English Premiership clubs arranged into pools consisting of three English and one Welsh team. English clubs have been allocated to the pools depending on their finish in the 2013–14 Aviva Premiership. Teams are guaranteed two home and two away pool matches, with teams in Pools 1 and 4 playing each other and teams in Pools 2 and 3 playing each other. The top team from each pool qualifies for the semi-finals. The competition will take place during the Autumn Internationals window and during the Six Nations thus allowing teams to develop their squad players.

Exeter Chiefs were the defending champions this season after claiming the cup with a 15–8 victory over Northampton Saints in the final at Sandy Park in Exeter. The final was won by Saracens 23–20 over Exeter Chiefs with a last-minute penalty from Ben Spencer securing the Londoners' second title in the competition.

Pool stages
Points system
The points scoring system for the pool stages will be as follows:
 4 points for a win
 2 points for a draw
 1 bonus point for scoring four or more tries in a match (TB)
 1 bonus point for a loss by seven points or less (LB)

Pool 1 v Pool 4

Round 1

Pool 2 v Pool 3

Semi finals

Final

References

2014-15
2014–15 rugby union tournaments for clubs
2014–15 English Premiership (rugby union)
2014–15 in Welsh rugby union